Little Papa is a 1935 Our Gang short comedy film directed by Gus Meins. It was the 138th Our Gang short that was released.

Plot
Although Spanky would like to play football with the rest of the gang, he is stuck at home taking care of his baby sister. Hoping to lull the kid to sleep, thereby allowing himself to sneak out of the house, Spanky tries all sorts of "sure-fire" beddie-bye methods. But neither he nor his co-conspirator "Alfalfa" are able to coerce the little brat into drifting off to dreamland—though they do briefly fall asleep themselves.

Their efforts finally fail when, in the process of inflating the football, they cause its air sac to burst loudly, waking the baby and ruining all their efforts.

Cast

The Gang
 Scotty Beckett as Scotty
 George McFarland as Spanky
 Carl Switzer as Alfalfa
 Billie Thomas as Buckwheat
 Alvin Buckelew as Alvin
 Dickie De Nuet as Little Our Gang member
 Sidney Kibrick as Our Gang member
 Donald Proffitt as Our Gang member

Additional cast
 Patsy May as Baby 
 Ruth Hiatt as Mother

Notes 
 This short marks the first appearance of Patsy May, who only made 3 other Our Gang appearances after this.

See also
 Our Gang filmography

References

External links

1935 films
American black-and-white films
1935 comedy films
Films directed by Gus Meins
Hal Roach Studios short films
Our Gang films
1935 short films
1930s American films